Saguanmachica may refer to:
 Cibyra saguanmachica, a species of moth endemic to Colombia
 Saguamanchica, second ruler (zipa) of the southern Muisca in central Colombia